The Basilica and Hermitage of Our Lady of Sorrows in Caeté, Minas Gerais state, Brazil, is a Baroque building dating to the XVIII Century. Its coordinates are: 19°49'22.033"S 043°40'31.62"W.

The place is where the groups of Terço dos Homens movement of the state of Minas Gerais gather annually.

References

Brazilian Baroque
Buildings and structures in Minas Gerais
Roman Catholic churches in Brazil